The Ringold Formation is a geologic formation in Eastern Washington, United States. It preserves fossils dating back to the Neogene period.

Exposures of the Ringold Formation can be found from Hanford Reach National Monument north to the Moses Lake area. Large portions of the formation are buried by other sediment deposits, extending as far as Wallula Gap southeast of Kennewick. In recent years, irrigation water entering the groundwater system has destabilized some Ringold Formation slopes and cliffs, causing landslides. The formation was named in 1917 for a school of the same name that existed at the time. Ringold School was located on the Franklin County side of the Columbia River to the south of Savage Island.

Geology
During the flood basalt eruptions before the sediments were laid down, the Columbia River followed a different route than it does today, taking it near the present-day sites of Yakima and Goldendale. North-to-south compression of the Columbia Plateau caused anticline folds like Rattlesnake Mountain and the Horse Heaven Hills to rise. These ridges provided geographic barriers, rerouting the river eastward toward the Tri-Cities with it eventually flowing through Wallula Gap. The Ringold Formation is the sediment laid down after this course change took place.

Some of the sediments found as part of the formation may have been sourced from ancestral versions of other Pacific Northwest rivers like the Clearwater and Pend Oreille.

Stratigraphy
The Ringold Formation represents sand and gravel placed by the Columbia River between 9 and 3 million years ago. These deposits overlay cooled lava erupted as part of the Columbia River Basalt Group, a type of volcanic eruption known as flood basalts erupting from fissures across eastern Washington and Oregon that were unrelated to the Cascade Range. It is covered in places by deposits from the Missoula Floods.

Regional uplift caused the Columbia to erode parts of the Ringold Formation. The White Bluffs on the Hanford Reach National Monument is a significant example of this.

Landslides
Landslides along the Columbia River have increased in recent years due to irrigation around Basin City and Othello. Irrigation water enters and flows through the groundwater system toward the river easily through deposits left by the Missoula Floods. This destabilizes Ringold Formation features like the White Bluffs, causing the landslides. Landslides did not occur frequently before 1960. Rapid changes in river flow caused by the Priest Rapids Dam upstream may also contribute to slope destabilization.

The largest landslide in the White Bluffs portion of the formation is adjacent to Locke Island. This complex, initiated in the 1970s, has rerouted the Columbia River. As a result of the change, critical salmon spawning habitat has been destroyed. The landslide restricts the flow of the river on the east side of the river and as a result, large portions of Locke Island are being removed by the Columbia River. Movement of this landslide is ongoing, but the primary factor behind the continued movement is destabilization by the Columbia River eroding the fallen material. Blown sand from this landslide is the primary source material for sand dunes atop the bluffs near the island.

The Locke Island slide is the northernmost slide along the White Bluffs. There are at least five other major slides into the Columbia River, with the southernmost one being across the river from Pacific Northwest National Laboratory in north Richland, which occurred in 2008. At least one slide has occurred in nearby coulees.

Paleontology
The sediments include fossils from the Miocene. Along the Columbia River, fossilized remains of rhinoceros and salmonoid fish. The largest diversity of remains have been found among the White Bluffs, which are an exposed portion of the uppermost part of the formation. In addition to those that were discovered along the river, there are 27 additional species. These include smaller animals such as frogs, lizards, and ring-tailed cats, as well as larger ones like horses, mastodons, and camels. Petrified wood can be found nearby. Analysis of late Miocene to early Pliocene fossils of ringtails suggests the area was once a much milder, but seasonal climate.

Several unique specimens have been found in the formation. An excavation done for a basement near Badger Mountain in Richland unearthed the northwesternmost example found thus far of Aphelops. This is also the only confirmed specimen of Aphelops in Washington.

See also

Hanford Reach
List of fossiliferous stratigraphic units in Washington (state)
Paleontology in Washington (state)

References

Columbia River
Neogene geology of Washington (state)